Aldemaro Romero en Maracaibo is a 33-RPM LP album by Venezuelan composer/arranger/conductor Aldemaro Romero, released in 1967 (see 1967 in music), along with the label Cymbal.

Romero brings at this album popular folk pieces, as a tribute to the city of Maracaibo, along with Mario Suárez and his group, Héctor Cabrera, Ramón Marquez Villa, the vocal groups Los Cuatro and Los Naipes.

Also at this album, Romero presents some popular songs of his repertoire like El Negro José and Doña Mentira.

Track listing

References

External links
Tracks and information of the album at Salvavinilos.com

1967 albums
Aldemaro Romero albums
Albums produced by Aldemaro Romero